Long Tan and similar may refer to:
 Long Tan (footballer), (Chinese order: Tan Long, 谭龙) a Chinese footballer (born 1988)
 Longtan Dam, a large dam on the Hongshui River in the Guangxi Zhuang Autonomous Region, China
 The Battle of Long Tan, fought by the Royal Australian Regiment in South Vietnam in August 1966

See also
 Longtan (disambiguation)
 Long Tân (disambiguation), various places in Vietnam